Jamna Pyari is a 2015 Indian Malayalam-language comedy film directed by Thomas Sebastian. It was a superhit film.The film stars Kunchacko Boban and Gayathri Suresh in the lead roles. Anishlal R S handles the cinematography.The music was composed by Gopi Sunder. The film released on 27 August 2015, received generally positive response from critics.

Plot 
The story begins with Vasu (Sijoy Varghese), father of Vasoottan (Kunchacko Boban) rescuing people from a bus which had fallen from a bridge in to a flooded river. During the rescue, Vasu drowns in front of the onlookers including his friend Prakashan (Joy Mathew), his wife and his child while trying to rescue a kid. Then the story moves over to Vasoottan (Kunchacko Boban) who is an Auto-Rickshaw driver, who is a very helpful person possessing many good qualities like his father. He helps anyone who is in need. Sabu (Suraj Venjarammoodu) is Vasoottan's friend, who was a one time goon and got reformed due to Vasoottan's influence. Vasoottan helps Sabu to marry Vinitha (Muthumani),his love interest. One day a girl named Parvathy (Gayathri Suresh) hires his auto to go to the Wadakkanchery Railway Station. After a few days Prakashan's son informs that a girl had come to their studio and had inquired about Vasoottan and also about the accident that took place long back in which Vasoottan had lost his Father. Vasoottan's friend Sabu speculates that it was Parvathy. Later, Vasoottan receives a call from Parvathy and she asks him to come to her house in order to meet her Father. Sabu and Prakashettan make a bet  stating that Parvathy loves Vasoottan and had called him in order to fix their marriage. Vasoottan goes to her house and gets to know that they had called him to seek his help to deliver 100 Jamnapyari goats to a foreign firm. Parvathy's Father (Maniyan Pilla Raju) and Mother (Anju Aravind) pleads Vasoottan for his help and he agrees to help them to deliver the Jamna Pyari goats on time (within a period of 12 days). Sridharan (Renji Panicker) is Parvathy's Father's rival and he tries all ways to get their business to fail with his money and muscle power. At first Vasoottan arranges 10 Jamna Pyaris from local, from where he gets Tony Kurishinkal as new to his team. Then they started giving advertisements in print, audio as well visual and e-medias. They received vide responses for the ads and finally they manages to reach the target.  After too many complication, Vasoottan succeed in his target and he and Parvathy gets their love succeed at the end

Cast
 Kunchacko Boban as Vasoottan, a Thrissur based Auto rickshaw driver, son of Vasu
 Gayathri Suresh as Parvathy (Paaru)
 Sijoy Varghese as Father of Vasoottan (Vasu)
 Suraj Venjaramoodu as S.P Sabu
 Aju Varghese as Rameshan (Raam)
 Renji Panicker as Sridharan
 Neeraj Madhav as Tony Kurishinkal (Bro)
 Joy Mathew as Prakashettan, Friend of Vasoottan's father Vasu
 Anumol as Veena
 Muthumani as Vinitha
 Maniyanpilla Raju as Parvathy's father
 Thrissur Elsy
 Rajasree Nair as Vimala as Vasoottan's mother
 Arjun Nandhakumar as Goutham/Sridharan's son
 Santhosh Keezhattoor
 Shiju
 Dinesh Prabhakar
 Anju Aravind as Parvathy's mother
 Gayathri Varsha 
 Sonia Agarwal as cameo appearance
 Harikumar as cameo appearance
 Sarath Orippuram as a man in the title song.

Box office
The film made at a budget of  stood at third position among the five Onam release films at the box office. Asianet bagged the satellite rights. It collected  from Kerala box office.

Soundtrack 

Muzik 247 released the songs of Jamna Pyari. The soundtrack was released during an audio launch event held at Panampilly Nagar, Kochi. The film crew chose an Auto rickshaw parking stand as the venue. Actor Nivin Pauly was the special guest for the event who launched the audio by unveiling the CD in the presence of local auto-rickshaw drivers and the public.

The film has three songs, which are composed by Gopi Sundar and penned by B. K Harinarayanan. These include "Vasoottan" sung by Franco Simon, "Jamnapyari" sung by Sachin Warrier and Maqbool, and "Murugappa" (also penned by Kalai Kumar) sung by Jassie Gift, Divya S. Menon and Vijay Yesudas. The lyrics of the song "Vasoottan" was written in the Thrissur dialect.

References

External links
 
 

2015 films
2010s Malayalam-language films
2015 romantic comedy-drama films
Indian romantic comedy-drama films
Films shot in Thrissur